The Vanderhoof Aquatic Centre is an indoor aquatic centre in Vanderhoof, British Columbia. The building was designed by Carscadden Stokes McDonald Architects Inc., built at a cost of $12 million and opened in January 2019. The facility features a six-lane 25-meter lap pool, 1,500 sq ft leisure pool and 35 person hot tub. The facility is owned by the District of Vanderhoof and operated by the YMCA of Northern BC.

Funding
The District of Vanderhoof applied for and successfully received $6 million from the federal government and $1.4 million from the federal gas tax fund. Vanderhoof additionally received a municipal loan of $3 million and also received a donation of $1 million from Vanderhoof Community Forest. Community crowdfunding and fundraisers raised an additional $300,000.

References

Swimming venues in British Columbia